Colin Walter Holder (born 6 January 1944) is an English former footballer who played as a centre forward.

Club career
Following joining Coventry City as a junior, Holder made his senior debut for the club at the age of 17 on 20 March 1961 in a Division Three 3–3 draw away at Newport County. Holder made nine Football League appearances, scoring four times, during his time at the club. In 1963, following a loan move to Lockheed Leamington whilst at Coventry, Holder joined Chelmsford City. Holder failed to settle at Chelmsford, after scoring twice in seven appearances, and departed the club in December 1963 to join Weymouth. Holder once again failed to settle at Weymouth and was loaned out to Nuneaton Borough and Stourbridge. Following a brief sabbatical away from football in 1964, Holder joined Deal Town. After scoring 10 times in 27 games in all competitions for Deal, Holder signed for Margate in November 1964. During the course of two seasons at Margate, Holder made 86 appearances, scoring 25 times.

In 1966, following an offer to play in Australia, Holder signed for hometown club Cheltenham Town, for whom his father also played for in the Southern League. Holder played for the club 24 times, scoring four before departing for Banbury United. Following a spell at Banbury, Holder played for Rugby Town, Gloucester City, Kidderminster Harriers, Salisbury, Burton Albion and Hednesford Town.

Managerial career
In 1981, Holder was appointed as Coleshill Town manager. During Holder's time at the club, Coleshill won the 1983 Walsall Senior Cup, before Holder left a year later. In December 1989, following a spell at Armitage, Holder returned to Banbury United as manager. Holder's tenure at the club lasted 13 months. In December 1991, Holder was appointed Willenhall Town manager, being sacked four months later.

References

1944 births
Living people
Association football forwards
English footballers
Sportspeople from Cheltenham
Coventry City F.C. players
Leamington F.C. players
Chelmsford City F.C. players
Weymouth F.C. players
Nuneaton Borough F.C. players
Stourbridge F.C. players
Deal Town F.C. players
Margate F.C. players
Cheltenham Town F.C. players
Banbury United F.C. players
Rugby Town F.C. (1945) players
Gloucester City A.F.C. players
Kidderminster Harriers F.C. players
Salisbury City F.C. players
Burton Albion F.C. players
Hednesford Town F.C. players
Coleshill Town F.C. players
Armitage 90 F.C. players
Banbury United F.C. managers
Willenhall Town F.C. managers
English football managers
English Football League players